Jingtang Library is a library located in Huicheng District, Guangdong, China. The library was established in 1925, by an Overseas Chinese founder Fung Ping Shan. The area of the library was initially 1,250 m2, and after a series of donations from Fung Ping-fan, the son of Fung Ping Shan, the library was expanded by 4,030 m2, and the new building of the library was built in 1988. In 2012, Huo Zongjie donated to build an extra reading room, named the “Huo Zongjie Reading Room”. In present day, the total area of the library reaches 6,510 m2 (70073.05 ft²) nowadays. More than 400,000 books was collected in the library.

Facilities
The library offers the following resources:
 Digital Reading Room
 Newspapers and Periodicals Reading Room
 Braille Material Service Room
 “Love-Tree” Story Room
 Exhibition Hall
 Book Check-in/Check-out Room
 Diversity Reading Room
 Children's Book Check-in/Check-out Room
 Special Collection Reading Room
 Class Room
 Study Room
 Xinhui Public Forum
 Multi-function Hall
 Huo Zongjie Reading Room

Collections 

There are a substantial number of collections in the library, including Local history, documents of the history of Overseas Chinese, Genealogy book, etc. For instance, the library is keeping Wan Guo Shi Ji (The Record of World History, Hua Guotang, 1900), and Da Xue Yan Yi Tong Lve (the 43rd year of Jiajing Emperor in Ming dynasty). Most of old books were collected from communities and families. In 1950s, Xinhui District organized a collection activity to search for old books from communities and families, to register and preserve those collections in the library. There are also collections like resources of Overseas Chinese including 20 types of papers dating back to the time before the establishment of People's Republic of China. For examples, the library has Siyi Newspaper (1917) and Gangzhou Weekly News (1925), which recorded the history of Xinhui District like Sun Ning Railway. Alternatively, there are collections dating back to nearly 900 years ago when Song dynasty was migrating to the south. For instance, the library has kept some Guqin music sheet like Gu Gang Zhe Hu Music Sheet. The library also collects more than 910 Genealogy book for up to 68 family names.

History 
Jingtang Library was established by Fung Ping Shan. Fung Ping Shan (1860-1931) was born in Xinhui District. At the age of 16, he moved to Siam (old name of Thailand) for a living. After a success on business, Fung focused on educational field. In Hong Kong, he donated to build The Chinese University of Hong Kong Library, The Chinese General Chamber of Commerce Library. And in Xinhui District, he had established Fung Ping Shan Private School, Woodworking School, and Ping Shan Primary School.

In 1922, Fung donated 10,000 yuan to build the library on Renshou Fang in the center of Xinhui District. He purchased Tan Mansion in Renshou Road (譚家大屋, a mansion pre-owned by family Tan) and demolished it to build the library. The library was completed in 1925 for an area of 1,250 m2 (13,454.89 ft²), and opened to public in June.

By 1938, the collections in the library reached 65,945 books. After the War of Resistance Against Japanese Aggression (also named as Second Sino-Japanese War) when Xinhui District was occupied, Fung Ping-Wah and Fung Ping-fan, sons of Fung Ping Shan, assisted the library to evacuate and reopen in Luokeng and Lingchong as branch libraries. In 1939, due to clerks’ leaving, branch library of Luokeng was closed and combined into branch library of Luochong. Another branch library, Tianting branch library, was established in 1941. Until 1949, Jingtang Library was reopened again.

In 1988, Fung Ping-fan donated to the library for refurbishment as well as extension of new building. The new building enlarged the area of the library by 4,030 m2 (43,378.56 ft²). In 2012, Huo Zongjie donated to build the Huo Zongjie Reading Room to further expand the library. Right now, the total area of the library is 6,510 m2 (70073.05 ft²), with more than 400,000 books of collection.

References 

Xinhui District
Libraries in Guangdong
1925 establishments in China
Libraries established in 1925